Michael Alston is an Australian disabled fencer.  He competed in the 1998 FESPIC Games and won a silver team medal. At the 1998 Stoke Mandeville Games, he won a gold medal in the foil event.  That same year, he also competed at the DEFI Sport Event held in Canada.  He won a silver medal in the épée event and a bronze medal in the sabre event. He was supported by the Blacktown City Council and was coached by Sally Kopiec.

At the 2000 Sydney Paralympics he represented Australia in the Men's Foil Individual A and Men's Sabre Individual A but did not medal.

References

Bibliography 

 

Australian male fencers
Paralympic wheelchair fencers of Australia
FESPIC Games competitors
Living people
Year of birth missing (living people)